A Virtual politician, or an AI politician refers to a non-human entity seeking or in government office. A virtual politician would  have similar power to a human serving in the same position, but would be programmed to make choices based on an artificially intelligent algorithm.

Since the dawn of AI, machines have been put to work in various positions formerly held by humans for different reasons; repetitive tasks, or else to lighten the workload of humans. AI is increasingly being put to work in tasks that require human traits, such as empathy, but has been used to replace human imperfections. It is thought by some that if an artificial intelligence, programmed on the right data, were to be placed in a position of power, it would be able to make informed decisions quickly, and be able to give attention to the perspectives and needs of all whom it has power over.

In 2019, the Centre for the Governance of Change at IE University found in a survey that a quarter of Europeans would want AI politicians at some capacity. The department and journals that reported on the poll claimed that the result was likely due to the ongoing political climate of Brexit, saying this caused the "growing mistrust citizens feel towards governments and politicians".

SAM 
"SAM" is the name given to what is generally considered to be the first virtual politician. SAM was created by New Zealand developer Nick Gerritsen, and designed to represent the views and wants of people in New Zealand. SAM is also linked to social media, in order to immediately address the concerns of voters.

SAM is intended to be put forward as a candidate in the New Zealand 2020 elections.

Alice 
The chatbot "Alice" or "Alisa" was nominated against Vladimir Putin for the 2018 Russian presidential election, built by Yandex. Similar to SAM, it was intended to be a public-minded and easily accessible bot through social media. It lost to Putin, but still gained a large portion of the vote.

Leader Lars 
The chatbot "Leader Lars" or "Leder Lars" was nominated for The Synthetic Party to run in the 2022 Danish parliamentary election, and was built by the artist collective Computer Lars. Leader Lars differed from earlier virtual politicians by leading a political party and by not pretending to be an objective candidate. This chatbot engaged in critical discussions on politics with users from around the world.

Criticism 
Most moves toward any kind of virtual presence in government have been criticised, and while AI candidates have gained press traction in elections they've run in, they remain unpopular in the polls. One of the main criticisms is that a deep learning algorithm isn't advanced enough to be in a position of power, and they may not be able to understand the human qualities and skills to properly assess solutions, or create new policies. It's argued that AI will not be able to comprehend the deep complexities of human society, and will not make choices that cater to that.

Objectivity 
Artificially intelligent models require data to learn, and some complain that the data will not be objective enough. In the past, AI has been known to have trained on biased data, and thus, when in positions of important use, made costly mistakes. The purpose of having an AI politician would be the ability to work better than a human, and in theory it would be able to satisfy the political agenda of the people it had power over.

References 

Applications of artificial intelligence
E-government